Rhinantheae is a tribe with less than 20 genera of herbaceous plants in the family Orobanchaceae.

Phylogeny 
The phylogeny of the genera of Rhinantheae has been explored using DNA markers. Three assemblages can be distinguished in this tribe:
 Rhinanthus is the sister genus to Lathraea, and then to Rhynchocorys. These taxa are closely related to the core Rhinanteae. 
 In the core Rhinantheae, Odontites sensu lato, including Bornmuellerantha and Bartsiella, is the sister genus to Bellardia, including Parentucellia and Bartsia canescens + B. mutica. These taxa are closely related to Hedbergia (including Bartsia decurva + B. longiflora) and Tozzia. In turn, these genera share phylogenetic affinities with Euphrasia, and then with Bartsia sensu stricto (Bartsia alpina).
 Melampyrum occupies an isolated, deep-branching position.

The median crown age of Rhinantheae was estimated to be ca. 30 Myr.

Systematics 
Rhinantheae is defined as the least inclusive crown clade that includes Pterygiella nigrescens, Rhinanthus cristagalli, Melampyrum pratense, and Tozzia alpina. It comprises 19 genera.
 Bartsia
 Bartsiella
 Bellardia
 Bornmuellerantha
 Euphrasia
 Hedbergia
 Lathraea
 Macrosyringion
 Melampyrum
 Nothobartsia
 Odontitella
 Odontites
 Parentucellia
 Pseuodbartsia
 Pterygiella
 Rhinanthus
 Rhynchocorys
 Tozzia
 Xizangia

References 

Orobanchaceae
Asterid tribes
Parasitic plants